Gem is an unincorporated community in Braxton County, West Virginia, United States.

Early variant names were Coger Bluff and Coger Station. The present name is derived from the name of G. E. McCoy, a pioneer citizen.

References

Unincorporated communities in Braxton County, West Virginia
Unincorporated communities in West Virginia